Naoki Sakurada   (born May 12, 1968) is a Japanese mixed martial artist. He competed in the Welterweight and Middleweight divisions. He is a former Shooto Middleweight Champion.

Mixed martial arts career
Sakurada started as a student of combat wrestling's (Japanese version of submission wrestling founding father Noriaki Kiguchi at Kiguchi Dojo. Sakurada competed almost exclusively in Shooto events, with the only exception when he faced Yasushi Warita at Vale Tudo Japan 1994 which ended in a draw. Sakurada challenged Yasuto Sekishima for the Shooto Middleweight Championship at Shooto - Shooto on November 28, 1990 but the bout ended in a draw.

A rematch of the championship bout took place at Shooto - Shooto on October 17, 1991. Sakurada claimed the title via unanimous decision and went on to successfully defend it once against Kazuhiro Kusayanagi at Shooto - Shooto on December 23, 1991 via majority decision.

At the turn of the millennium he founded Gutsman Shooto Dojo, where he has coached mixed martial artists such as Hayato Sakurai, Hisae Watanabe and Mizuto Hirota.

Championships and accomplishments
Shooto
Shooto Middleweight Championship (one time)
One title defense

Mixed martial arts record

|-
| Win
| align=center| 12–6–4
| Yasunori Okuda
| Submission (heel hook)
| Shooto - Vale Tudo Access 4
| 
| align=center| 1
| align=center| 3:00
| Japan
| 
|-
| Win
| align=center| 11–6–4
| Maurice Roumimper
| Submission (heel hook)
| Shooto - Vale Tudo Access 3
| 
| align=center| 2
| align=center| 1:10
| Tokyo, Japan
| 
|-
| Win
| align=center| 10–6–4
| Kotaro Shimamoto
| Decision (unanimous)
| Shooto - Vale Tudo Access 1
| 
| align=center| 5
| align=center| 3:00
| Tokyo, Japan
| 
|-
| Draw
| align=center| 9–6–4
| Yasushi Warita
| Draw
| Vale Tudo Japan 1994
| 
| align=center| 5
| align=center| 3:00
| Urayasu, Chiba, Japan
| 
|-
| Win
| align=center| 9–6–3
| Yuji Hashiguchi
| KO
| Shooto - Shooto
| 
| align=center| 3
| align=center| 1:18
| Tokyo, Japan
| 
|-
| Draw
| align=center| 8–6–3
| Erik Paulson
| Draw
| Shooto - Shooto
| 
| align=center| 5
| align=center| 3:00
| Tokyo, Japan
| 
|-
| Loss
| align=center| 8–6–2
| Manabu Yamada
| Submission (kneebar)
| Shooto - Shooto
| 
| align=center| 5
| align=center| 1:19
| Tokyo, Japan
| 
|-
| Win
| align=center| 8–5–2
| Kazuhiro Kusayanagi
| Decision (unanimous)
| Shooto - Shooto
| 
| align=center| 5
| align=center| 3:00
| Tokyo, Japan
| 
|-
| Win
| align=center| 7–5–2
| Tomohiro Tanaka
| KO
| Shooto - Shooto
| 
| align=center| 2
| align=center| 0:00
| Tokyo, Japan
| 
|-
| Loss
| align=center| 6–5–2
| Yuichi Watanabe
| Submission (kneebar)
| Shooto - Shooto
| 
| align=center| 3
| align=center| 0:57
| Tokyo, Japan
| 
|-
| Win
| align=center| 6–4–2
| Kazuhiro Kusayanagi
| Decision (majority)
| Shooto - Shooto
| 
| align=center| 5
| align=center| 3:00
| Tokyo, Japan
| 
|-
| Win
| align=center| 5–4–2
| Yasuto Sekishima
| Decision (majority)
| Shooto - Shooto
| 
| align=center| 5
| align=center| 3:00
| Osaka, Japan
| 
|-
| Win
| align=center| 4–4–2
| Yuichi Watanabe
| Submission (armbar)
| Shooto - Shooto
| 
| align=center| 5
| align=center| 2:03
| Tokyo, Japan
| 
|-
| Win
| align=center| 3–4–2
| Tomonori Ohara
| Submission (armbar)
| Shooto - Shooto
| 
| align=center| 5
| align=center| 0:00
| Tokyo, Japan
| 
|-
| Loss
| align=center| 2–4–2
| Kenji Kawaguchi
| Submission (guillotine choke)
| Shooto - Shooto
| 
| align=center| 1
| align=center| 0:00
| Tokyo, Japan
| 
|-
| Draw
| align=center| 2–3–2
| Yasuto Sekishima
| Draw
| Shooto - Shooto
| 
| align=center| 5
| align=center| 3:00
| Tokyo, Japan
| 
|-
| Draw
| align=center| 2–3–1
| Yuji Ito
| Draw
| Shooto - Shooto
| 
| align=center| 5
| align=center| 3:00
| Tokyo, Japan
| 
|-
| Loss
| align=center| 2–3
| Yasuto Sekishima
| Decision
| Shooto - Shooto
| 
| align=center| 5
| align=center| 3:00
| Tokyo, Japan
| 
|-
| Loss
| align=center| 2–2
| Kenji Kawaguchi
| TKO (punches)
| Shooto - Shooto
| 
| align=center| 4
| align=center| 1:29
| Tokyo, Japan
| 
|-
| Win
| align=center| 2–1
| Takashi Ishizaki
| Decision (unanimous)
| Shooto - Shooto
| 
| align=center| 3
| align=center| 3:00
| Tokyo, Japan
| 
|-
| Win
| align=center| 1–1
| Yuichi Watanabe
| Submission (heel hook)
| Shooto - Shooto
| 
| align=center| 1
| align=center| 0:00
| Tokyo, Japan
| 
|-
| Loss
| align=center| 0–1
| Kazuhiro Kusayanagi
| Submission (armbar)
| Shooto - Shooto
| 
| align=center| 1
| align=center| 0:00
| Tokyo, Japan
|

See also
List of male mixed martial artists

References

External links
 
 Naoki Sakurada at mixedmartialarts.com
 Naoki Sakurada at fightmatrix.com

1968 births
Japanese male mixed martial artists
Welterweight mixed martial artists
Middleweight mixed martial artists
Mixed martial artists utilizing wrestling
Living people